Christian Eigler (born 1 January 1984) is a German former professional footballer who played as a striker.

Career
Eigler was born in Roth. He started his professional career at SpVgg Greuther Fürth. In 2006, he finished the second division season with 18 goals, which made him top scorer of the league and took part in the 2006 UEFA European Under-21 Football Championship with the German squad.

He was transferred to Greuther Fürth's rivals Nürnberg in 2008, when Thomas von Heesen was coach there. He had previously played in another squad for which von Heesen has had responsibility for some time, Arminia Bielefeld.  His professional playing career ended in 2015 after his three-year stay at FC Ingolstadt 04.

References

External links
 
 

1984 births
Living people
People from Roth (district)
Sportspeople from Middle Franconia
German footballers
Footballers from Bavaria
Germany under-21 international footballers
Association football forwards
Bundesliga players
2. Bundesliga players
FC Ingolstadt 04 players
1. FC Nürnberg players
SpVgg Greuther Fürth players
Arminia Bielefeld players